Anthony Acampora is a professor emeritus of Electrical and Computer Engineering as well as the founder of the Center for Wireless Communications at the University of California, San Diego.

Education and career 
Acampora earned a Ph.D. in electrical engineering from Brooklyn Polytechnic Institute in 1973. Before joining the University of California, San Diego in 1995, he served as a professor of electrical engineering and as the Director of the Center for Telecommunications Research at Columbia University. Acampora is also an Institute of Electrical and Electronics Engineers fellow.

Research 
He is known to be a 'leading expert in telecommunications' and is interested in improving digital infrastructure through investigating challenges like broadband packet networks, network management, and universal wireless access.

Selected publications 

 An Introduction to Broadband Networks

References 

Living people
University of California, San Diego faculty
Electrical engineering academics
Polytechnic Institute of New York University alumni
Year of birth missing (living people)